Super-LOTIS is the second incarnation of the Livermore Optical Transient Imaging System, located at the Steward Observatory on Kitt Peak. It
is an automated telescope designed to slew very rapidly to the location of gamma-ray bursts (GRBs), to enable the simultaneous measurement of optical counterparts. GRBs can occur anywhere in the sky, fade very quickly, and were initially poorly localized, so the original LOTIS needed very rapid slewing (less than 10 sec) and an extremely wide field of view (greater than 15 degrees). However, this wide field of view meant it could not see faint sources, and only the brightest GRB afterglows could be studied.

Later satellites such as HETE-2, and  BATSE detector of the Compton Gamma Ray Observatory, delivered much more accurate GRB coordinates in real-time. This enabled the construction of Super-LOTIS, based upon a Boller and Chivens 0.6 meter telescope, with a much smaller field of view (originally 51' by 51'), but much deeper imaging. After a few years of operation in this mode (2000 to 2003), the Swift Gamma-Ray Burst Mission was launched in 2004 providing even smaller error boxes. The super-LOTIS optics were modified again, now with a 17' by 17' field of view at the secondary focus, and a simultaneous visible/NIR camera.

To achieve the needed response time, Super-LOTIS is fully automated and connected via Internet socket to the Gamma-ray Burst Coordinates Network. It is still in operation as of 2012.

Since GRB searches only occupy a small fraction of the possible observing time, Super-LOTIS is also used for supernova searches and general astronomy.

References

 

Robotic telescopes
Gamma-ray astronomy
Kitt Peak National Observatory